Abbas Zandi (3 June 1930 – 30 October 2017) was an Iranian Bastani practitioner, Freestyle Wrestler, national champion, and coach. Zandi had competed in three Olympic games including 1948 London, 1952 Helsinki and 1956 Melbourne.

Early life and career
Zandi was born in the Sang-e-laj neighborhood of Tehran. When he was 14, he went to Babr Club and learned wrestling from Abdolhossein Feyli and Hassan Sa'dian. At 17, he became one of the Iran national freestyle wrestling athletes. One year later, Zandi achieved the Pahlevan of Iran title. He died on 30 October 2017 at the age of 87.

References

External links 
 
 

1930 births
2017 deaths
Olympic wrestlers of Iran
Wrestlers at the 1948 Summer Olympics
Wrestlers at the 1952 Summer Olympics
Wrestlers at the 1956 Summer Olympics
Iranian male sport wrestlers
People from Tehran
Asian Games gold medalists for Iran
Asian Games medalists in wrestling
Pahlevans of Iran
Wrestlers at the 1958 Asian Games
Medalists at the 1958 Asian Games
20th-century Iranian people
21st-century Iranian people
World Wrestling Champions